Little Long Pond is a  pond in Plymouth, Massachusetts, north of Long Pond and Gallows Pond. The outflow of this pond is a stream that feeds into Long Pond.

There is another Little Long Pond partially within Plymouth's borders located east of the southeasternmost point of Myles Standish State Forest.

References

External links

Mass Division of Fisheries and Wildlife Pond map/info
Six Ponds Improvement Association

Ponds of Plymouth, Massachusetts
Ponds of Massachusetts